Makepeace is an English surname derived from the medieval English Mak(en), to make, plus Pais, peace.  It originally designated a mediator, one who is skilled at negotiation of hostilities. It may refer to:

People
Brian Makepeace (born 1931), English footballer
Chris Makepeace (born 1964), Canadian film and television actor
Harry Makepeace (1881–1952), English cricketer and footballer
John Makepeace (born 1939), British furniture designer and maker
Jonathan Makepeace (1774–1850), American businessman and politician
Mary Lou Makepeace, American activist and politician, first female mayor of Colorado Springs (1997–2003)
Ralph Makepeace (1909–1995), English footballer
Reginald Makepeace (1890–1918), British First World War flying ace
Troy Makepeace (born 1979), Australian rules footballer
William Makepeace Thackeray (1811–1863), British novelist, author and illustrator

Fictional characters
 Detective Sergeant Lady Harriet "Harry" Makepeace, in Dempsey and Makepeace, a British television crime drama
Quentin Makepeace, a villain in the Bartimaeus Sequence series of children's novels
Colonel Makepeace, in Stargate SG-1
Tom Makepeace, in House of Cards
Winter Makepeace and Asa Makepeace, in the Maiden Lane series of romance novels by Elizabeth Hoyt

See also
C. R. Makepeace & Company, a defunct architectural firm in Rhode Island, United States
D. E. Makepeace Company, a historical building in Attleboro, Massachusetts, United States
George Makepeace House, a historical building in Madison, Indiana, United States

Surnames of English origin